Internal heat is the heat source from the interior of celestial objects, such as stars, brown dwarfs, planets, moons, dwarf planets, and (in the early history of the Solar System) even asteroids such as Vesta, resulting from contraction caused by gravity (the Kelvin–Helmholtz mechanism), nuclear fusion, tidal heating, core solidification (heat of fusion released as molten core material solidifies), and radioactive decay. The amount of internal heating depends on mass; the more massive the object, the more internal heat it has; also, for a given density, the more massive the object, the greater the ratio of mass to surface area, and thus the greater the retention of internal heat. The internal heating keeps celestial objects warm and active.

Small celestial objects 

In the early history of the Solar System, radioactive isotopes having a half-life on the order of a few million years (such as aluminium-26 and iron-60) were sufficiently abundant to produce enough heat to cause internal melting of some moons and even some asteroids, such as Vesta noted above.  After these radioactive isotopes had decayed to insignificant levels, the heat generated by longer-lived radioactive isotopes (such as potassium-40, thorium-232, and uranium-235 and uranium-238) was insufficient to keep these bodies molten unless they had an alternative source of internal heating, such as tidal heating.  Thus, Earth's Moon, which has no alternative source of internal heating is now geologically dead, whereas a moon as small as Enceladus that has sufficient tidal heating (or at least had it recently) and some remaining radioactive heating, is able to maintain an active and directly detectable cryovolcanism.

Planets

Terrestrial planets 
The internal heating within terrestrial planets powers tectonic and volcanic activities. Of the terrestrial planets in the Solar System, Earth has the most internal heating because it is the largest. Mercury and Mars have no ongoing visible surface effects of internal heating because they are only 5 and 11% the mass of Earth respectively; they are nearly "geologically dead" (however, see Mercury's magnetic field and Geological history of Mars).  Earth, being more massive, has a great enough ratio of mass to surface area for its internal heating to drive plate tectonics and volcanism.

Gas giants 
The gas giants have much greater internal heating than terrestrial planets, due to their greater mass and greater compressibility making more energy available from gravitational contraction. Jupiter, the most massive planet in the Solar System, has the most internal heating, with core temperature estimated to be 36,000 K. For the outer planets of the Solar System, internal heating powers the weather and wind instead of sunlight that powers the weather for terrestrial planets. The internal heating within gas giant planets raise temperatures higher than effective temperatures, as in the case of Jupiter, this makes 40 K warmer than given effective temperature. A combination of external and internal heating (which may be a combination of tidal heating and electromagnetic heating) is thought to make giant planets that orbit very close to their stars (hot Jupiters) into "puffy planets" (external heating is not thought to be sufficient by itself).

Brown dwarfs 
Brown dwarfs have greater internal heating than gas giants but not as great as stars. The internal heating within brown dwarfs (initially generated by gravitational contraction) is great enough to ignite and sustain fusion of deuterium with hydrogen to helium; for the largest brown dwarfs, it is also enough to ignite and sustain fusion of lithium with hydrogen, but not fusion of hydrogen with itself. Like gas giants, brown dwarfs can have weather and wind powered by internal heating. Brown dwarfs are substellar objects not massive enough to sustain hydrogen-1 fusion reactions in their cores, unlike main-sequence stars. Brown dwarfs occupy the mass range between the heaviest gas giants and the lightest stars, with an upper limit around 75 to 80 Jupiter masses (MJ). Brown dwarfs heavier than about 13 MJ are thought to fuse deuterium and those above ~65 MJ, fuse lithium as well.

Stars 
The internal heating within stars is so great that (after an initial phase of gravitational contraction) they ignite and sustain thermonuclear reaction of hydrogen (with itself) to form helium, and can make heavier elements (see Stellar nucleosynthesis). The Sun for example has a core temperature of 13,600,000 K. The more massive and older the stars are, the more internal heating they have. During the end of its lifecycle, the internal heating of a star increases dramatically, caused by the change of composition of the core as successive fuels for fusion are consumed, and the resulting contraction (accompanied by faster consumption of the remaining fuel). Depending upon the mass of the star, the core may become hot enough to fuse helium (forming carbon and oxygen and traces of heavier elements), and for sufficiently massive stars even large quantities of heavier elements. Fusion to produce elements heavier than iron and nickel no longer produces energy, and since stellar cores massive enough to attain the temperatures required to produce these elements are too massive to form stable white dwarf stars, a core collapse supernova results, producing a neutron star or a black hole, depending upon the mass.  Heat generated by the collapse is trapped within a neutron star and only escapes slowly, due to the small surface area; heat cannot be conducted out of a black hole at all (however, see Hawking radiation).

External links 
 The Heat History of the Earth

Planetary science
Thermodynamics